Castle High School may refer to:

 United Kingdom
Castle High School (Belfast) in Belfast, Northern Ireland
Castle High School (Dudley) in Dudley, England

 United States
John H. Castle High School in Newburgh, Indiana
James B. Castle High School in Kaneohe, Hawaii

See also
Castle Hill High School in Castle Hill, New South Wales, Australia
Castle Hill High School, Offerton in Stockport, England, United Kingdom
Mearns Castle High School in Newton Mearns, East Renfrewshire, Scotland, United Kingdom